North Santee is an unincorporated community in Georgetown County, South Carolina, United States. It is located south of Georgetown on U.S. Route 17 on the Santee River. Thomas Lynch, Jr. was born here at the Hopsewee house.

Unincorporated communities in South Carolina
Unincorporated communities in Georgetown County, South Carolina